"Dangerous" is a song by the British singer-songwriter James Blunt. It was released as the fifth single from his third studio album, Some Kind of Trouble on 26 July 2011. The song was written by Nik Kershaw.

Music video
A music video to accompany the release of "Dangerous" was first released onto YouTube on 20 September 2011 at a total length of three minutes and nineteen seconds. The video, directed by Luc Janin, was filmed at London burlesque club Volupté. It is filmed from the perspective of a woman walking through various rooms in the club, including kitchens, until at the end of the video she encounters Blunt. It was filmed in a single tracking shot.

Track listing
 UK Digital Download
 "Dangerous" - 3:10

Chart performance

Release history

References

2011 singles
Songs written by Nik Kershaw
James Blunt songs
2010 songs
Song recordings produced by Steve Robson
Atlantic Records singles
Custard Records singles